John Watson (3 November 1850 – 6 May 1907), was a minister of the Free Church of Scotland. He is remembered as an author of fiction, known by his pen name Ian Maclaren.

Life
The son of John Watson, a civil servant, he was born in Manningtree, Essex, and educated at Stirling. His paternal uncle Rev Hiram Watson (1813-1891) was a minister of the Free Church of Scotland and John appears to have chosen to follow in his shoes.

He studied at Edinburgh University, then trained as a Free Church minister at New College in Edinburgh, also undertaking some postgraduate study at Tübingen.

In 1874 he was licensed by the Free Church of Scotland and became assistant minister of Edinburgh Barclay Church. In 1875 he was ordained as minister at Logiealmond in Perthshire. In 1877  he was transferred to St Matthews Free Church in Glasgow. In Glasgow he lived at 44 Windsor Terrace. In 1880 he became minister of Sefton Park Presbyterian Church in Liverpool, from which he retired in 1905. During this period he was a main mover in the founding of the Westminster College in Cambridge.

In 1896 he was Lyman Beecher lecturer at Yale University, and in 1900 he was moderator of the synod of the English Presbyterian Church. While travelling in the United States he died from blood poisoning, following a bout with tonsilitis, at Mount Pleasant, Iowa. His body was returned to England, and buried in Smithdown Cemetery in Liverpool.

Maclaren's first stories of rural Scottish life, Beside the Bonnie Brier Bush (1894), achieved extraordinary popularity, selling more than 700,000 copies, and was succeeded by other successful books, The Days of Auld Lang Syne (1895), Kate Carnegie and those Ministers (1896), and Afterwards and other Stories (1898). By his own name Watson published several volumes of sermons, among them being The Upper Room (1895), The Mind of the Master (1896) and The Potter's Wheel (1897).  Today he is regarded as one of the principal writers of the Kailyard school. 

It is thought that Maclaren was the original source of the quotation “Be kind, for everyone you meet is fighting a hard battle,” now widely misattributed to Plato or Philo of Alexandria. The oldest known instance of this quotation is in the 1897 Christmas edition of The British Weekly, penned by Maclaren: “Be pitiful, for every man is fighting a hard battle.”

The highly impressive St Matthews Free Church became the Highland Memorial Church in 1941 and was destroyed by fire in 1952.

Family

In 1878, Maclaren married Jane B Ferguson.

Bibliography

Fiction as Ian Maclaren

Non-fiction as Ian Maclaren

Books of sermons as John Watson

Other books as John Watson
 1907: The Scot of the eighteenth century: his religion and his life
 1912: Children of the Resurrection

References

External links

 
 
 
 
 Article on Ian Maclaren in March 1895 edition of The Bookman (New York)

1850 births
1907 deaths
People from Tendring (district)
Anglo-Scots
19th-century Ministers of the Free Church of Scotland
Alumni of the University of Edinburgh
Yale University faculty
Kailyard school
19th-century Scottish writers
20th-century Ministers of the Free Church of Scotland
19th-century pseudonymous writers